Heydarlu (also Romanized as Ḩeydarlū; also known as Ḩeydarlū-ye Sīr) is a village in Baranduz Rural District, in the Central District of Urmia County, West Azerbaijan Province, Iran. At the 2006 census, its population was 238, in 64 families.

References 

Populated places in Urmia County